Clegg is a given name and an English surname. Notable people with the name include:

Given name
 Clegg Hoyt (1910–1967), American actor

Surname
 Alec Clegg (1909–1986), English educationalist
 Barbara Clegg, British actor
Betty Clegg (1926 - 2009), New Zealand watercolour artist
 Brian Clegg (disambiguation)
 Charles Clegg (footballer) (1850–1937), English footballer
 Charles Clegg (1916–1979), American author
 Don Clegg (1921–2005), English footballer
 Douglas Clegg (born 1958), American author
 Eileen Clegg, American journalist
 Ellen Clegg (c. 1841–?), American pickpocket and shoplifter
 Henry Clegg (1850–1920), English cricketer
 Hugh Clegg (doctor) (1900–1983), English doctor
 Hugh Clegg (industrial relations) (1920–1995), professor and industrial relations expert. 
 Joe Clegg (1869–1902), English footballer
 John Clegg (actor) (born 1934), English actor
 Johnny Clegg (1953–2019), British-born South African musician and anthropologist
 Judith Clegg (born 1971), British strategy consultant, technology entrepreneur and angel investor
 Lee Clegg, British soldier
 Michael Clegg (born 1977), English footballer
 Mitchell Clegg (born 1990), Australian darts player
 Moses Clegg (1876–1918), American bacteriologist who was the first scientist to segregate and propagate the leprosy bacillus
 Nick Clegg (born 1967), British politician, former Deputy Prime Minister of the United Kingdom and leader of the Liberal Democrats
 Robert Clegg Jr. (born 1954), former US state senator
 Robin Clegg (born 1977), Canadian biathlete
 Roger Clegg, American lawyer and former government official
 Ron Clegg (1927–1990), an Australian footballer
 Samuel Clegg (1781–1861), British engineer
 Stephen Clegg Rowan (1808–1890), US vice admiral
 Thaddeus von Clegg, German clockmaker who constructed the first kazoo in the 1840s
 Tom Clegg (actor) (1915–1996), English actor
 Tom Clegg (director) (1934–2016), English film director
 Walter Clegg (1920–1994), British Conservative politician
 William Clegg (footballer) (1852–1932), English footballer and politician
 William Clegg (cricketer) (1869–1949), English cricketer
 William Henry Clegg, first Governor of the South African Reserve Bank (1920–1931)

Fictional characters 

 Corporal Clegg, a fictional character in eponymous rock song by Pink Floyd
Edward Clegg, a fictional character in the Has Fallen film series starring Gerard Butler
 Lelia Clegg, a fictional character in the Australian TV police drama Blue Heelers
 Les Clegg, a fictional character in the British TV soap opera Coronation Street
 Maggie Clegg, a fictional character in Coronation Street
 Norman Clegg, a fictional character in the British TV sitcom Last of the Summer Wine
Colonel Clegg Forbes, fictional character in The Twilight Zone episode And When The Sky Was Opened

See also 
 Clegg-Hill, surname
 Captain Clegg (disambiguation)

English-language surnames